Shmuel Malika-Aharon (1 January 1947 – 16 August 2011) was an Israeli footballer. He competed in the men's tournament at the 1968 Summer Olympics.

References

External links
 

1947 births
2011 deaths
Israeli footballers
Israel international footballers
Olympic footballers of Israel
Footballers at the 1968 Summer Olympics
Footballers from Tel Aviv
Association football goalkeepers
Road incident deaths in Israel
Maccabi Tel Aviv F.C. players
Bnei Yehuda Tel Aviv F.C. players
Maccabi Petah Tikva F.C. players
Hapoel Holon players
Hapoel Rishon LeZion F.C. players